Football 5-a-side at the 2015 ASEAN Para Games was held at Marina Bay Sands, Singapore.

Medal table

Medalists

External links
 8th ASEAN Para Games 2015 - Singapore

2015 ASEAN Para Games
Football 5-a-side at the ASEAN Para Games